Hats Off is a lost silent short film starring American-British comedy double act Laurel and Hardy. The team appeared in a total of 107 films between 1921 and 1951.

Plot 
Stan and Ollie are salesmen attempting to sell a washing machine; they fail constantly after several near misses. One would-be sale has them carrying the machine up a large flight of steps, only to find out that a young lady wants them to post a letter for her. The boys later get into an argument knocking off each other's hats, which eventually involves scores of others. A police van eventually carts all those involved away except Stan and Ollie, who afterwards try to find their own headgear amongst the hundreds of others lying on the street.

Cast
Stan Laurel – Stan
Oliver Hardy – Ollie
Anita Garvin – Customer at top of stairs
Jimmy Finlayson – Proprietor, Kwickway Washing Machine Co.
Dorothy Coburn – Vision
Chet Brandenburg – Pedestrian #1
Sam Lufkin – Pedestrian #2
Ham Kinsey – Pedestrian #2

Preservation status 
Hats Off was an enormous success when first released, which made considerable headway in establishing the Laurel and Hardy team with the public. After being last publicly shown in Germany in 1930, Hats Off disappeared and is now considered a lost film. Laurel and Hardy historian Randy Skretvedt dubbed Hats Off the "Holy Grail of Laurel and Hardy movies."

Notes
Hats Off was remade by Laurel and Hardy as The Music Box, utilizing the same flight of steps in the Silver Lake district of Los Angeles. While a washing machine was delivered in Hats Off, a piano would be delivered in The Music Box.
The long staircase used by The Three Stooges in their 1941 film An Ache in Every Stake (147 steps in length) is approximately two miles northeast, located at 2212 Edendale Place in the Silver Lake district of Los Angeles.
Hats Off was remade by the same director (Hal Yates) in 1945 as It's Your Move, starring Edgar Kennedy, but utilizing a different staircase although located in the same vicinity where the "Music Box Steps" are in Silver Lake (known as the Descanso Stairs, they are situated at the intersection of Descanso and Larissa Drives, specifically between the residences of 3217 Descanso Dr. and 3200–3206 Larissa Dr. and one block from Sunset Blvd. which can be seen in the background in several long shots).

See also
List of lost films

References

External links
 
 
 

1927 films
1927 comedy films
American silent short films
American black-and-white films
Films directed by Hal Yates
Laurel and Hardy (film series)
Lost American films
Films with screenplays by H. M. Walker
1927 lost films
Lost comedy films
1920s American films
Silent American comedy films
1920s English-language films